Vardaraj Shetty (known as Raj Shetty) is the founder, chairman and Managing Worker of the Ramee Group of Companies. The Ramee Group began operations in the early 1990s and now comprises 52 hotels in India and the Persian Gulf region.

Early life

Shetty was born in the small town of Malili, near Malulu, on Oct. 13, 1960. He lived with his family in Malala for the early part of his life. His family had been in the business of restaurants and food, and he wanted to enter the hospitality business. Once his father died in 1973, he worked towards his education. He started to work at a young age and moved to Dubai when he was 18.

Career

Shetty first invested in the Al Ras hotel in Deira. In 1997 he launched the Ramee Group of Hotels, Resorts and Apartments. As of 2017 it operated 42 hotels, apartments and resorts in India, Dubai, Abu Dhabi, Bahrain and Muscat. Regent Palace Hotel is the Group's flagship hotel. He launched Ramee Grand Hotel & Spa, a 5 star property in Bahrain. Shetty owns R-Adda and Bombay Adda, which are lounges in Mumbai & Bangalore.

Mid-range offerings are underway with the Ramee Rose concept, with projects in Abu Dhabi, Chennai and Mumbai. The Ramee Group is actively engaged in the real estate development, hotel management contracting and travel agency operations. The group employs more than 5,000 employees from 15 countries across the globe.

Ramee Foundation

Shetty is the Founder Trustee of Ramee Foundation & Charitable Trust, which is engaged in charitable activities such as helping the deserved in the fields of Education and Medical Help.

Through the Ramee foundation he has supported many students financially to complete their Education. One of the major contributions is building a First Grade College in Koteshwara, Kundapur, Udupi District. When he realised that no proper buildings were available for one of the government colleges there, he constructed a building and gave it to the government. The college changed its name to "Kalavara M. Varadaraja Shetty First Grade College". Some 2000 students study there.

Signature F&B outlets

Restaurans operated by the group include:

 Rock Bottom Café RUKA Lounge (Japanese restaurant/lounge on the roof top of Ramee Grand Hotel)
 Mirchi (Indian restaurant and takeaway)
 Rocky's Café
 Far East Seafood Market (Far Eastern style restaurant with seawater tanks)
 Bollywood Café

Recognition

Shetty featured in the Forbes Middle East Magazine in the list of Top 100 Indian Leaders in the U.A.E, and Top Indian leaders in the Arab World 2014: Top Owners. He has received numerous awards, including South India Travel Awards, West India Travel Awards, NRI of the Year Awards and Hotelier Middle East Power 50 Awards.

References

1960 births
Living people
Indian chairpersons of corporations
Hotel chains in India
Hotel chains in the United Arab Emirates